Denis Lemieux (born 1964) is a Canadian politician, who was elected to represent the riding of Chicoutimi—Le Fjord in the House of Commons of Canada in the 2015 Canadian federal election. Citing family reasons, he announced his resignation on November 6, 2017. It took effect on December 1, 2017.

Lemieux holds a bachelor's degree in general engineering and has held a variety of positions in industrial companies in the region.

Electoral record

References

External links
 

Living people
Canadian engineers
Liberal Party of Canada MPs
Members of the House of Commons of Canada from Quebec
Politicians from Saguenay, Quebec
Université du Québec à Chicoutimi alumni
21st-century Canadian politicians
1964 births